Jodie Melanie Connor (born 8 May 1981) is an English singer, songwriter and Goodwill ambassador.

Connor's first number-one charted song was as a guest vocalist on Roll Deep's number-one single "Good Times". She was later signed by Polydor Records and Takeover Entertainment and released her debut solo single "Now or Never" on 16 January 2011, which peaked at number 14. A second single, "Bring It" featuring Tinchy Stryder was released on 20 February 2011 following its first play on BBC Radio 1 and debuted at number 11 on the UK R&B Chart. Connor's latest release was in 2018 on Solo Suspex's single “Back To You”.

Music career

Early career
Early in Connor's career, she attended Saddleworth School for her high school education before attending Oldham College where she studied performing arts and graduated. Connor worked as receptionist in a sports club by day and gigged and performed in the evenings and on weekends. In 2003, Connor appeared as a contestant on the second series of the hit British television talent show Pop Idol. She was an early favourite of the judges, and made it to the final fifty of the competition, earning her the chance to perform live to the nation, but was eliminated after failing to finish in the top two in her group, instead placing fourth of ten. Connor was given a second chance by the judges, and was invited back for the Wildcard round, but again was unsuccessful in making it through to the next round, and was eliminated for good.

2010–present: Breakthrough and first studio album
Connor returned to spotlight in 2010, when she featured on grime collective Roll Deep's comeback single "Good Times"; which she helped to co-write. On 2 May 2010, the single debuted on the UK Singles Chart at number 1, where it remained for three consecutive weeks. The single not only marked Connor's first chart performance, but also Roll Deep's first top 10 hit. Connor then continued her breakthrough, appearing on videos "Electric Boogaloo (Find a Way)" and "Higher State" by Wiley and Bailey respectively. Following the success of Connor's breakthrough, she was signed to Polydor Records and Takeover Entertainment, spending the remainder of 2010 recording material for her debut album. On 16 January 2011, Connor released her debut single, "Now or Never" featuring Wiley, in the UK, which debuted at number 14 on the UK Singles Chart and number 6 on the UK R&B Chart. On 20 February 2011, Connor released her second single, "Bring It" featuring Tinchy Stryder, also in the UK, which debuted at number 11 on the UK R&B Chart, following its first play on BBC Radio 1.

In December 2010, Connor announced that she is to be spending time between Los Angeles and New York City working in the studio with Roc Nation-Songwriter's Makeba Riddick and James Fauntleroy II on her debut album, and that the album would be scheduled for release in the fourth-quarter of 2012. The third single from the album entitled "Take You There" and featuring American rapper Busta Rhymes was released on 29 July 2012.

Other ventures
In February 2011, Connor was announced as the new face of Tinchy Stryder's Star in the Hood female clothing line. In March 2011, Connor was appointed as a goodwill ambassador for Prince Charles' The Prince's Trust.

Personal life
Connor's family are of Afro-Barbadian/White Barbadian descent. Her mother is named Kathleen. Connor lived in Shaw and Crompton.

She has two sons, one born in 2014 and one born in November 2016.

Discography

Singles

As lead artist

As featured artist

Guest appearances

Music videos

Cameo appearances

See also
List of artists who reached number one on the UK Singles Chart

References

Living people
1981 births
Takeover Entertainment artists
English lyricists
English people of Barbadian descent
Pop Idol contestants
People from Oldham
21st-century Black British women singers
People from Shaw and Crompton
English women pop singers